In molecular biology, the protein domain, Ydc2 (also known as SpCce1), is a Holliday junction resolvase from the fission yeast Schizosaccharomyces pombe that is involved in the maintenance of mitochondrial DNA.

Function
In molecular biology, the Ydc2 domains are enzymes, or in other words biological catalysts, capable of resolving Holliday junctions into separate DNA duplexes by cleaving DNA after 5'-CT-3, and 5'-TT-3, sequences.

Properties
The junction resolving enzymes are very diverse, but have the following properties in common:
high structure specificity for binding
metal dependent, sequence specific cleavage activity
Essentially, they are highly specific.

Limiting factors
Furthermore, the cleavage efficiency is affected by:
strand type (continuous or exchange)
nucleotide sequence at cleavage site

Structure
This protein domain forms a ribonuclease H fold consisting of two beta sheets and one alpha helix, arranged as a beta-alpha-beta motif. Each beta sheet has five strands, arranged in a 32145 order, with the second strand being antiparallel to the rest.

References

Protein domains